The Aluna is a left tributary of the river Șușița in Romania. It discharges into the Șușița in Varnița.

References

 – Valea Șușiței 

Rivers of Romania
Rivers of Vrancea County